

List of rulers of the Akan state of Assin Apimenem

See also
Akan people
Ghana
Gold Coast
Lists of incumbents

Rulers
Government of Ghana
Lists of African rulers